BMI Research is a research firm that provides macroeconomic, industry and financial market analysis, covering 29 industries and 200 global markets. It was founded in 1984 as Business Monitor International. In 2014 it was acquired by Fitch Group.
 On July 30, 2018, BMI Research was integrated into Fitch Solutions as Fitch Solutions Macro Research.

History

BMI Research was founded in 1984 as Business Monitor International by Richard Londesborough and Jonathan Feroze with an initial focus on Latin America. By 1994 it was producing 10 monitor newsletters and 25 business forecast reports.

In 1997, the company (then known as Business Monitor International) won the Queen's Award for export.

International office expansion began in 2008 with Singapore, followed in 2009 by New York, and in 2010 with Pretoria. In 2012, the company acquired Espicom Business Intelligence, "a UK-based company with a 30-year pedigree providing business intelligence on Medical Devices, Pharmaceuticals & Healthcare and Therapeutics across global markets".

On September 9, 2009, the company "received a substantial, non-controlling equity investment from Spectrum Equity Investors", which the private equity firm held until March 14, 2014, when Fitch Group announced that it had acquired the company (then still called Business Monitor International). In June, 2014, Richard Hall
 was appointed as CEO, and the firm re-branded as BMI Research in March, 2015. Richard Hall left the company in October 2015.

On July 30, 2018, BMI Research was integrated into Fitch Solutions as Fitch Solutions Macro Research.

BMI Research's clients include corporations, financial institutions, governments and academic institutions; among the academic institutions that subscribe to BMI Research are Cornell University, Nanyang Technological University, National University of Singapore, Northeastern University, San Diego State University, Stanford University, University of Alberta, University of Auckland, University of Melbourne, University of Minnesota, The University of Western Ontario,
 and others.

Areas of research focus

 Country Risk - 200 countries
 Financial Markets 
 Agribusiness, Automobiles, Banking & Financial Services, Consumer & Retail, Consumer Electronics, Defence & Security, Food & Drink, Freight Transport & Shipping, Information Technology, Infrastructure, Insurance, Medical Devices, Metals, Mining, Oil & Gas, Petrochemicals, Pharmaceuticals & Healthcare, Power, Real Estate, Renewables, Telecommunications, Tourism

Influence

BMI Research regularly offers commentary and analysis in the media, and the company's analysts have been quoted in media outlets such as Associated Press, Bloomberg News, CNBC, The Daily Telegraph, The Diplomat, Financial Times, Fortune (magazine), The Globe and Mail, Infrastructure Investor, Institutional Investor (magazine), The Japan Times, Le Monde, Reuters, The Wall Street Journal, and The Washington Post.

References

External links 
 Official Web Site

Companies established in 1984